David Wesley Behrman (November 9, 1941 – December 9, 2014) was an American football offensive lineman who played in the American Football League for the Buffalo Bills and Denver Broncos. He was the fourth overall pick in the 1963 AFL Draft by the Bills and the 11th pick in the 1963 NFL Draft by the Chicago Bears. He also played in the Midwest Football League for the Lansing All Stars / Capitals and Flint Sabres from 1972 to 1976.

College career
Behrman played college football at Michigan State University.

Professional career

Buffalo Bills
Behrman was the Bills' first-round draft pick in 1963 and played for them that year, but not in 1964. During the 1965 AFL season, Behrman became the Bills' starting center, replacing veteran Walt Cudzik, playing between left offensive guard Billy Shaw and right guard Al Bemiller. However, due to a back injury, Behrman did not play when the Bills won their second AFL Championship game over the San Diego Chargers by a score of 23-0 under head coach Lou Saban. That season, Behrman was an AFL All-Star center. However, he did not play in 1966, replaced by Bemiller.

Denver Broncos
Behrman played with the AFL's Denver Broncos during the 1967 AFL season when he played in 11 games.

Midwest Football League
Behrman signed with the Lansing All Stars of the Midwest Football League in September 1972. He played with the Flint Sabres in 1973 and 1974. He rejoined Lansing, now called the Lansing Capitals, in July 1975. He played with the Capitals through 1976.

Personal
On December 9, 2014, he died of pancreatic cancer.

See also
 Other American Football League players

References

1941 births
2014 deaths
People from Dowagiac, Michigan
Players of American football from Michigan
American football centers
American football offensive tackles
Michigan State Spartans football players
Buffalo Bills players
American Football League All-Star players
Denver Broncos (AFL) players
American Football League players
Midwest Football League (1962–1978) players